Ka is the first consonant of the Indic abugidas. In modern Indic scripts, ka is derived from the Brāhmī letter , which is (according to the Semitic hypothesis) derived from the Aramaic  ("K").

Mathematics

Āryabhaṭa numeration

Aryabhata used Devanāgarī letters for numbers, very similar to the Greek numerals, even after the invention of Indian numerals.
The values of the different forms of क are: 
क  = 1 (१)
कि  = 100 (१००)
कु  = 10,000 (१० ०००)
कृ  = 1,000,000 (१० ०० ०००)
कॢ  = 1 (१०८)
के  = 1 (१०१०)
कै  = 1 (१०१२)
को  = 1 (१०१४)
कौ  = 1 (१०१६)

Tabla Strokes
In Tabla notation, क (ka) also seen as कि (ki), or के (ke) is a flat, nonresonant stroke of the left hand. The heel of the hand is left on the drum, while the hand rotates to hit the drum, with the focus of the force being focused between the tips and first joints of the fingers.

Hindu astrology
के (ke) is the abbreviation used for केतु (Ketu), the descending lunar node. In Hindu astrology, Ketu represents karmic collections both good and bad, spirituality, and supernatural influences. Ketu is associated with the Matsya Avatar (Fish Incarnation) of Vishnu. Ketu signifies the spiritual process of the refinement of materialization to spirit and is considered both malefic and benefic, as it causes sorrow and loss, and yet at the same time turns the individual to God. In other words, it causes material loss in order to force a more spiritual outlook in the person. Ketu is a karaka or indicator of intelligence, wisdom, non-attachment, fantasy, penetrating insight, derangement, and psychic abilities. Ketu is believed to bring prosperity to the devotee's family, removes the effects of snakebite and illness arising out of poisons. He grants good health, wealth and cattle to his devotees.

Historic Ka
There are three different general early historic scripts - Brāhmī and its variants, Kharoṣṭhī, and Tocharian, the so-called slanting Brahmi. Ka as found in standard Brahmi,  was based on a simple "+" shape, with slight variations toward the Gupta . The Tocharian Ka  had an alternate Fremdzeichen form, . The third form of Ka, in Kharoṣṭhī (𐨐) was probably derived from Aramaic separately from the Brahmi letter.

Brahmi Ka
The Brahmi letter , ka, is probably derived from the Aramaic Kaph, and is thus related to the modern Latin K and Greek Kappa. Several identifiable styles of writing the Brahmi Ka can be found, most associated with a specific set of inscriptions from an artifact or diverse records from an historic period. As the earliest and most geometric style of Brahmi, the letters found on the Edicts of Ashoka and other records from around that time are normally the reference form for Brahmi letters, with vowel marks not attested until later forms of Brahmi back-formed to match the geometric writing style.

Tocharian Ka
The Tocharian letteris derived from the Brahmi , and has an alternate Fremdzeichen formused in conjuncts and as an alternate representation of Kä.

Kharoshthi Ka
The Kharoshthi letter  is generally accepted as being derived from the Aramaic Kaph, and is thus related to K and Kappa, in addition to the Brahmi ka.

Devanagari Ka

Ka (क) (कवर्ण kavarn) is the first consonant of the Devanagari abugida. It ultimately arose from the Brahmi letter , after having gone through the Gupta letter . Letters that derive from it are the Gujarati letter ક, and the Modi letter 𑘎.

Devanagari-using Languages
नकली = nakali  "fake"
In this example, क implements its inherent vowel, the schwa.
बकवास = bakvās  "nonsense"
In this example, क deletes the inherent schwa for correct pronunciation.

Certain words that have been borrowed from Persian and Arabic implement the nukta to more properly approximate the original word. It is then transliterated as a q.
क़दम = qadam  "footstep"

Conjuncts With क

Devanagari exhibits conjunct ligatures, as is common in Indic scripts. In modern Devanagari texts, most conjuncts are formed by reducing the letter shape to fit tightly to the following letter, sometimes referred to as a "half form". Most Devanagari letters drop a character's vertical stem to create a half form, but due to its large tail to the right of the stem, the common half form of क has its tail reduced to attach to the following letter. Some conjunct clusters are always represented by a true ligature, instead of a shape that can be broken into constituent independent letters. Vertically stacked conjuncts are ubiquitous in older texts, while only a few are still used routinely in modern Devanagari texts. The use of ligatures and vertical conjuncts may vary across languages using the Devanagari script, with Marathi in particular preferring the use of half forms where texts in other languages would show ligatures and vertical stacks.

Ligature conjuncts of क
True ligatures are quite rare in Indic scripts. The most common ligated conjuncts in Devanagari are in the form of a slight mutation to fit in context or as a consistent variant form appended to the adjacent characters. Those variants include Na and the Repha and Rakar forms of Ra. Nepali and Marathi texts use the "eyelash" Ra half form  for an initial "R" instead of repha.
 Repha र্ (r) + क (ka) gives the ligature rka: 

 Eyelash र্ (r) + क (ka) gives the ligature rka:

 क্ (k) + rakar र (ra) gives the ligature kra:

 ङ্ (ŋ) + क্ (k) + rakar र (ra) gives the ligature ŋkra:

 क্ (k) + न (na) gives the ligature kna:

 क্ (k) + त (ta) gives the ligature kta:

 क্ (k) + त্ (t) + rakar र (ra) gives the ligature ktra:

 क্ (k) + त্ (t) + व (va) gives the ligature ktva:

 ङ্ (ŋ) + क্ (k) + त (ta) gives the ligature ŋkta:

Devanagari Kṣa

One of the most common true ligatures in Devanagari is the conjunct kṣa क्ष. This ligature is a required form for most Devanagari languages, and the conjunct even has its own half form that freely joins other letters in horizontal conjuncts.
 क্ (k) + ष (ṣa) gives the ligature kṣa:

 Repha र্ (r) + क্ (k) + ष (ṣa) gives the ligature rkṣa:

 Eyelash र্ (r) + क্ (k) + ष (ṣa) gives the ligature rkṣa:

 छ্ (cʰ) + क্ (k) + ष (ṣa) gives the ligature cʰkṣa:

 ढ্ (ḍʱ) + क্ (k) + ष (ṣa) gives the ligature ḍʱkṣa:

 ड্ (ḍ) + क্ (k) + ष (ṣa) gives the ligature ḍkṣa:

 द্ (d) + क্ (k) + ष (ṣa) gives the ligature dkṣa:

 ङ্ (ŋ) + क্ (k) + ष (ṣa) gives the ligature ŋkṣa:

 ङ্ (ŋ) + क্ (k) + ष্ (ṣ) + य (ya) gives the ligature ŋkṣya:

 ट্ (ṭ) + क্ (k) + ष (ṣa) gives the ligature ṭkṣa:

 ठ্ (ṭʰ) + क্ (k) + ष (ṣa) gives the ligature ṭʰkṣa:

Stacked conjuncts of क
Vertically stacked ligatures are the most common conjunct forms found in Devanagari text. Although the constituent characters may need to be stretched and moved slightly in order to stack neatly, stacked conjuncts can be broken down into recognizable base letters, or a letter and an otherwise standard ligature.
 ब্ (b) + क (ka) gives the ligature bka:

 छ্ (cʰ) + क (ka) gives the ligature cʰka:

 च্ (c) + क (ka) gives the ligature cka:

 ढ্ (ḍʱ) + क (ka) gives the ligature ḍʱka:

 ड্ (ḍ) + क (ka) gives the ligature ḍka:

 द্ (d) + क (ka) gives the ligature dka:

 ह্ (h) + क (ka) gives the ligature hka:

 क্ (k) + ब (ba) gives the ligature kba:

 क্ (k) + च (ca) gives the ligature kca:

 क্ (k) + ड (ḍa) gives the ligature kḍa:

 ख্ (kʰ) + क (ka) gives the ligature kʰka:

 क্ (k) + ज (ja) gives the ligature kja:

 क্ (k) + ज্ (j) + ञ (ña) gives the ligature kjña:

 क্ (k) + क (ka) gives the ligature kka:

 क্ (k) + ल (la) gives the ligature kla:

 क্ (k) + ङ (ŋa) gives the ligature kŋa:

 क্ (k) + ञ (ña) gives the ligature kña:

 क্ (k) + व (va) gives the ligature kva:

 ळ্ (ḷ) + क (ka) gives the ligature ḷka:

 ङ্ (ŋ) + क (ka) gives the ligature ŋka:

 फ্ (pʰ) + क (ka) gives the ligature pʰka:

 ठ্ (ṭʰ) + क (ka) gives the ligature ṭʰka:

 ट্ (ṭ) + क (ka) gives the ligature ṭka:

 व্ (v) + क (ka) gives the ligature vka:

Bengali Ka

The Bengali script ক is derived from the Siddhaṃ , and is marked by a similar horizontal head line, but less geometric shape, than its Devanagari counterpart, क. The inherent vowel of Bengali consonant letters is /ɔ/, so the bare letter ক will sometimes be transliterated as "" instead of "". Adding , the "o" vowel mark, কো, gives a reading of /ko/.
Like all Indic consonants, ক can be modified by marks to indicate another (or no) vowel than its inherent "a".

ক in Bengali-using languages
ক is used as a basic consonant character in all of the major Bengali script orthographies, including Bengali and Assamese. It is also used with a nukta, ক়, for foreign borrowings of /q/.

Conjuncts with ক
Bengali ক exhibits conjunct ligatures, as is common in Indic scripts, with a tendency towards stacked ligatures.

Conjuncts in Kssa ক্ষ 

The most important conjunct of ক is the irregular  ligature ক্ + ষ [ṣ] = ক্ষ. This conjunct not only has a special form in all Bengali alphabets, it even functions as an independent letter in the Assamese orthography.

This ক্ষ conjunct forms regular conjuncts with other letters, keeping its distinct form:
 ক্ষ + ম gives the ligature :

 ক্ষ + ম্ + য gives the ligature , with the  suffix:

 ক্ষ + ন gives the ligature :

 ক্ষ + ব gives the ligature , with the  suffix:

 ক্ষ + য gives the ligature , with the  suffix:

Other conjuncts of ক 
 ক্ + র gives the ligature , with a variant ligature instead of a  suffix:

 ঙ + ক্ + র gives the conjunct , with a variant of the  ligature:

 স্ + ক্ + র gives the conjunct , with the  ligature:

 ষ্ + ক্ + র gives the conjunct , with the  ligature:

 ক্ + ক gives the ligature :

 ক্ + ল gives the ligature :

 ক্ + ম gives the ligature :

 ক্ + স gives the ligature :

 ক্ + ত gives the ligature :

 ক্ + ত্ + র gives the ligature , with the  suffix:

 ক্ + ট gives the ligature :

 ক্ + ট্ + র (r) gives the ligature , with the  suffix:

 ক্ + ব gives the ligature , with the  suffix:

 ক্ + য gives the ligature , with the  suffix:

 ল্ + ক gives the ligature :

 ল্ + ক্ + য gives the ligature , with the  suffix:

 ঙ + ক gives the ligature :

 ঙ + ক্ + শ gives the ligature :

 ঙ + ক্ + য gives the ligature , with the  suffix:

 র্ + ক gives the ligature , with the  prefix:

 র্ + ক্ + য gives the ligature , with the  prefix and  suffix:

 স্ + ক gives the ligature :

 ষ্ + ক gives the ligature :

 ত্ + ক gives the ligature :

Gujarati Ka

Ka (ક) is the first consonant of the Gujarati abugida. It is derived from the Devanagari Ka , and ultimately the Brahmi letter . ક (Ka) is similar in appearance to ફ (Pha), and care should be taken to avoid confusing the two when reading Gujarati script texts.

Gujarati-using Languages
The Gujarati script is used to write the Gujarati and Kutchi languages. Like all Indic scripts, Gujarati uses vowel marks attached to the base consonant to override the inherent /ə/ vowel:

Conjuncts with ક
Gujarati ક exhibits conjunct ligatures, much like its parent Devanagari Script. While most Gujarati conjuncts can only be formed by reducing the letter shape to create a "half form" that fits tightly to following letter, Ka does not have a half form. A few conjunct clusters can be represented by a true ligature, instead of a shape that can be broken into constituent independent letters, and vertically stacked conjuncts can also be found in Gujarati, although much less commonly than in Devanagari. Lacking a half form, Ka will normally use an explicit virama when forming conjuncts without a true ligature.
True ligatures are quite rare in Indic scripts. The most common ligated conjuncts in Gujarati are in the form of a slight mutation to fit in context or as a consistent variant form appended to the adjacent characters. Those variants include Na and the Repha and Rakar forms of Ra.
 ક્ (k) + ર (ra) gives the ligature KRa:

 ર્ (r) + ક (ka) gives the ligature RKa:

 ઙ્ (ŋ) + ક (ka) gives the ligature ṄKa:

 ક્ (k) + ષ (ʂa) gives the ligature KṢa:

 ર્ (r) + ક (ka) ષ (ʂa) gives the ligature RKṢa:

 ઙ્ (ŋ) + ક (ka) ષ (ʂa) gives the ligature ṄKṢa:

Javanese Ka

Telugu Ka

Ka (క) is the first consonant of the Telugu abugida. It ultimately arose from the Brahmi letter . It is closely related to the Kannada letter ಕ. Most Telugu consonants contain a wedge-shaped headline that is related to the horizontal headline found in other Indic scripts, although headlines do not connect adjacent letters in Telugu.

Telugu conjuncts are created by reducing trailing letters to a subjoined form that appears below the initial consonant of the conjunct. Many subjoined forms are created by dropping their headline, with many extending the end of the stroke of the main letter body to form an extended tail reaching up to the right of the preceding consonant. This subjoining of trailing letters to create conjuncts is in contrast to the leading half forms of Devanagari and Bengali letters. Ligature conjuncts are not a feature in Telugu, with the only non-standard construction being an alternate subjoined form of Ṣa (borrowed from Kannada) in the KṢa conjunct.

Malayalam Ka

Ka (ക) is a consonant of the Malayalam abugida. It ultimately arose from the Brahmi letter , via the Grantha letter  Ka. Like in other Indic scripts, Malayalam consonants have the inherent vowel "a", and take one of several modifying vowel signs to represent syllables with another vowel or no vowel at all.

Conjuncts of ക

As is common in Indic scripts, Malayalam joins letters together to form conjunct consonant clusters. There are several means of forming conjuncts in Malayalam: using a subjoined form of a trailing consonant placed under the initial consonant of a conjunct, a combined ligature of the two consonants joined together, a conjoining form that appears as a combining mark on the rest of the conjunct, the use of an explicit candrakkala mark to suppress the inherent "a" vowel, or a special consonant form called a "chillu" letter, representing a bare consonant without the inherent "a" vowel. Texts written with the modern reformed Malayalam orthography, put̪iya lipi, may favor more regular conjunct forms than older texts in paḻaya lipi, due to changes undertaken in the 1970s by the Government of Kerala.
 ല് (l) + ക (ka) gives the ligature lka:

 യ് (y) + ക (ka) gives the ligature yka:

 ങ് (ŋ) + ക (ka) gives the ligature ŋka:

 ക് (k) + ക (ka) gives the ligature kka:

 ഴ് (lll) + ക (ka) gives the ligature lllka:

 ക് (k) + ട (ṭa) gives the ligature kṭa:

 ക് (k) + ണ (ṇa) gives the ligature kṇa:

 ക് (k) + ത (ta) gives the ligature kta:

 ക് (k) + ന (na) gives the ligature kna:

 ക് (k) + മ (ma) gives the ligature kma:

 ക് (k) + ര (ra) gives the ligature kra:

 ക് (k) + സ (sa) gives the ligature ksa:

 ക് (k) + ഷ (ṣa) gives the ligature kṣa:

 ക് (k) + ഷ് (ṣ) + ണ (ṇa) gives the ligature kṣṇa:

 ക് (k) + ഷ് (ṣ) + മ (ma) gives the ligature kṣma:

 ക് (k) + ഷ് (ṣ) + ല (la) gives the ligature kṣla:

Odia Ka

Ka (କ) is a consonant of the Odia abugida. It ultimately arose from the Brahmi letter , via the Siddhaṃ letter  Ka. Like in other Indic scripts, Odia consonants have the inherent vowel "a", and take one of several modifying vowel signs to represent syllables with another vowel or no vowel at all.

Conjuncts of କ 
As is common in Indic scripts, Odia joins letters together to form conjunct consonant clusters. The most common conjunct formation is achieved by using a small subjoined form of trailing consonants. Most consonants' subjoined forms are identical to the full form, just reduced in size, although a few drop the curved headline or have a subjoined form not directly related to the full form of the consonant. The second type of conjunct formation is through pure ligatures, where the constituent consonants are written together in a single graphic form. This ligature may be recognizable as being a combination of two characters or it can have a conjunct ligature unrelated to its constituent characters.
 ଙ୍ (ŋ) + କ (ka) gives the ligature ŋka:

 ତ୍ (t) + କ (ka) gives the ligature tka:

 ର୍ (r) + କ (ka) gives the ligature rka:

 କ୍ (k) + ର (ra) gives the ligature kra:

Odia Kṣa କ୍ଷ 

Although ostensibly a conjunct of Ka and Ssa, Odia କ୍ଷ (Kṣa) is largely treated as an independent letter pronounced /kʰjɔ/. Unlike other Odia conjuncts, କ୍ଷ can be found as an independent letter subjoined to another letter or conjunct.
 ତ୍ (t) + କ୍ (ka) + ଷ (ṣa) gives the ligature tkṣa:

Meitei Mayek Kok

The Meitei letter Kok (Manipuri: head) has the phonetic value /ka/, and like in other Indic scripts, it takes vowel matras to alter its inherent vowel.  Unlike in other Indic scripts, it has a special "lonsum" form for indicating a syllable coda consonant sound, while an explicit killer apun iyek, is optionally used to indicate a consonant cluster.

Much like the Tibetan script from which it derives, the Meitei script, used to write the Manipuri language of far eastern India has remnants of the headline common in other Indic scripts in many of its letters, but does not connect the headlines of adjacent letters. Historically, Meitei exhibited conjoining behavior, but this is not a behavior of Meitei letters in modern usage.

Comparison of Ka glyphs
The various Indic scripts are generally related to each other through adaptation and borrowing, and as such the glyphs for cognate letters, including Ka, are related as well.

Character encodings of Ka
Most Indic scripts are encoded in the Unicode Standard, and as such the letter Ka in those scripts can be represented in plain text with unique codepoint. Ka from several modern-use scripts can also be found in legacy encodings, such as ISCII.

References

 Conjuncts are identified by IAST transliteration, except aspirated consonants are indicated with a superscript "h" to distinguish from an unaspirated cononant + Ha, and the use of the IPA "ŋ" and "ʃ" instead of the less dinstinctive "ṅ" and "ś".

Further reading
 Kurt Elfering: Die Mathematik des Aryabhata I. Text, Übersetzung aus dem Sanskrit und Kommentar. Wilhelm Fink Verlag, München, 1975, 
 Georges Ifrah: The Universal History of Numbers. From Prehistory to the Invention of the Computer. John Wiley & Sons, New York, 2000, .
 B. L. van der Waerden: Erwachende Wissenschaft. Ägyptische, babylonische und griechische Mathematik. Birkhäuser-Verlag, Basel Stuttgart, 1966, 
 
 

Bengali language
Indic letters